Raed Chabab Boumerdès, known as RC Boumerdès or simply RCB for short, is an Algerian football club located in Boumerdès, Algeria. The club was founded in 1983 and its colours are white and blue. Their home stadium, Stade olympique de Boumerdès, has a capacity of 15,000 spectators. The club is currently playing in the Ligue Nationale du Football Amateur.

History

See also
League Boumerdès Football Association

References

External links
 Fédération Algérienne de Football
 Ligue de Football Professionnel
 Ligue Nationale du Football Amateur

Football clubs in Algeria
Association football clubs established in 1983
RC Boumerdes
1983 establishments in Algeria
Sports clubs in Algeria